The Enseigne Roux class was the thirteenth class of destroyers to be built for the French Navy during World War I. The first two units of this class, the Enseigne Roux and the Mécanicien Principal Lestin saw use during the war. However, the construction of the third ship of the class — Enseigne Gabolde — was suspended in 1914. It was then resumed in 1921, and completed in 1923 to a modified design.

Design and construction
The Ensigne Roux-class was an enlarged derivative of the previous , themselves an improved . Two ( and ) were ordered from Rochefort Dockyard to a standard design, while a third  was ordered from the Le Havre shipyard of Normand to a modified design, with different machinery.

They displaced . Enseigne Gabolde was longer, and was fitted with geared steam turbines instead of direct drive units.

The design armament was as for the previous two classes, i.e. two  Mle 1893 guns, four  Mle 1902 guns and two twin 450 mm torpedo tubes. During the First World War, a  anti-aircraft gun was added, with an anti-submarine armament of ten depth charges and a towed explosive sweep.

Enseigne Roux and Mécanicien Principal Lestin were laid down in late 1913, launched in 1915 and 
completed in 1916. Construction of Enseigne Gabolde was suspended due to the war, with her boilers used in other ships, with work not restarting until after the end of the war, and she was not completed until 1923.

Ships

Citations

References

 
 
 

Destroyer classes
Destroyers of the French Navy
 
 
Ship classes of the French Navy